I Got the Feeling is a new jack swing song by Motown artists Today, written by Dr. Freeze. The first track from their album The New Formula, the single was released on August 17, 1990.  The song peaked at No. 12 on the Billboard Hot R&B Singles chart. It was featured on the soundtrack to the 2004 game Grand Theft Auto: San Andreas on the CSR 103.9 station.

References 

1990 songs
1990 singles
New jack swing songs
Motown singles
Songs written by Dr. Freeze